Fulata Lusungu Mbano Moyo is a Malawian systematic and feminist theologian who is an advocate for gender justice.

Early life and education
Fulata Mbano was born in northern Malawi, a member of the Ngoni people from Mzimba District. Her great grandfather, Songea, was a warrior chief. Her name, Fulata, means she was born feet first. Her father started his own church after he was not accepted in mainline churches due to his polygamy.

Moyo is a survivor of childhood sexual abuse. She grew up in a small village called Engcongolweni Lazaro Jere and went to school in the nearest town, Ekwendeni. She attended a Roman Catholic high school, Marymount Girls Secondary School, before going on to study education at the University of Malawi, Chancellor College.

Moyo completed a master's degree in Christian thought, systematic and feminist theology from the University of Zimbabwe in 1993, and earned a PhD from the School of Religion and Theology at the University of KwaZulu-Natal in South Africa in 2009, with a focus on ethics, gender and religion, including some work as a research fellow at Yale University's Center for Interdisciplinary Research on AIDS. She has also trained as a mediator and studied Viktor Frankl's Logotherapy.

Career
Moyo served as a teaching assistant in the School of Religion and Theology at the University of KwaZulu-Natal, and then as a member of the faculty at the University of Malawi in the Department of Theology and Religious Studies. She was also involved in the Tamar Campaign, which sought to address violence against women and children using contextual study of the Bible. She undertook ethnographic research in Malawi, hoping that the matrilineal system would "translate into something of a matriarchy", but was disappointed to see the pervasiveness of patriarchy due to Christianity. During this time, the nation experienced the peak of the HIV/AIDS epidemic, which also shaped her research into gender and sexual justice. She applied for ordination in the Presbyterian Church but was "silently refused."

Moyo worked for the World Council of Churches as Program Executive for Women in Church and Society from 2007 until 2019. She was based in Geneva and oversaw the project "A Just Community of Women and Men". She encouraged churches to adopt the "Thursdays in Black" campaign against rape and violence, which was inspired by the Mothers of the Disappeared in Argentina who protested at the Plaza de Mayo on Thursdays, and Women in Black in Israel.

For the 2016–2017 academic year, Moyo was a visiting lecturer on Women's Studies and African Religions at Harvard Divinity School, where she developed an Ethic of Care to help religious communities respond to women who had survived sex trafficking. She also worked with Elisabeth Schüssler Fiorenza on feminist hermeneutics. In 2018, she was appointed to an independent expert panel to review UNAIDS policies and processes for addressing and preventing harassment.

In 2020, Moyo founded "Stream", a US registered NGO that supports and mentors survivors of sex trafficking.

Moyo is a member of the Circle of Concerned African Women Theologians, first participating in Nairobi and then restarting the Malawi chapter and serving as Secretary of the Board for Theological Studies in 1996 She was General Coordinator from 2007 to 2013. She is also a member of the Community Voices in Peace and Pluralism in Africa, and the Board of Life and Peace Institute in Sweden. She is the Vice President of the AfriAus iLEAC Board.

Writing
Moyo has written more than 29 publications in five languages. Her writings have predominantly addressed religious and cultural influences on gender construction and women's sexuality. She argues that religious scripture must be interpreted in the context of women's experiences, which will help raise awareness of issues that dehumanize women.

Moyo was a contributor to AfricaPraying : a handbook on HIV-AIDS sensitive sermon guidelines and liturgy, published in 2003. She co-edited Women Writing Africa: Eastern African Region, published by Feminist Press in 2007. She has been a guest editor for the Ecumenical Review in 2012 and the International Review of Mission in 2015.

Selected publications

Journal articles

Book chapters

 Moyo, Fulata Lusungu (2017). "'Ukugqiba inkaba'—Burying the Umbilical Cord: An African Indigenous Ecofeminist Perspective on Incarnation". In Grace Ji-Sun Kim; Hilda P. Koster (eds.). Planetary Solidarity: Global Women's Voices on Christian Doctrine and Climate Justice. Fortress Press. pp. 179–192.

Personal life
Moyo was married to Solomon Moyo until his death from liver cancer in 1999. She has written about her experience of forgiving his infidelity.

References

External links
 

Living people
University of Malawi alumni
Academic staff of the University of Malawi
University of KwaZulu-Natal alumni
Academic staff of the University of KwaZulu-Natal
University of Zimbabwe alumni
Harvard Divinity School faculty
Malawian theologians
Women Christian theologians
21st-century Protestant theologians
Christian feminist theologians
Malawian women writers
Malawian human rights activists
Malawian feminists
Malawian Presbyterians
People of the World Council of Churches
Year of birth missing (living people)
Malawian women's rights activists